The Irish League in season 1977–78 comprised 12 teams. Linfield won the championship.

League standings

Results

References
Northern Ireland - List of final tables (RSSSF)

NIFL Premiership seasons
1977–78 in Northern Ireland association football
North